Engan Brahmapurisvarar Temple is a Siva temple located in Engan at a distance of 13 km. from Tiruvarur in Tiruvarur district of Tamil Nadu, India.

Presiding deity
The presiding deity is known as Brahmapurisvarar and the Goddess is known as Periyanayaki. Vanni is the temple tree. The temple tank is Kumara tirtta.

Muruga shrine
In this temple, the shrine of Muruga is considered as the primary shrine. The shrine of Muruga can be reached through the southern entrance of the temple.

Other shrines
This temple is also known as Brahmeesvaram. It has rajagopura facing east and another entrance facing south. The shrine of the Goddess is found in the north of front mandapa. It has one prakara. In the kosta, Dakshinamurti, Ardhanarishvara, Brahma and Durga are found.

References

External links

Photogallery 

Hindu temples in Tamil Nadu
Shiva temples in Tiruvarur district